Henry N. Small (born April 25, 1947) is a former American football coach and college athletics administrator. He served as the head football coach at Lehigh University in Bethlehem, Pennsylvania from 1986 to 1993, compiling a record of 47–40–1. Small was athletic director at Charleston Southern University, an NCAA Division I school in Charleston, South Carolina from 2001 to 2018.

Small spent four years as the offensive coordinator at Wake Forest University and also coached at Rutgers University, Florida State University, Princeton University, and Brown University. He also spent a year in the player personnel office of the New England Patriots of the National Football League (NFL).

Head coaching record

College

References

1947 births
Living people
American football wide receivers
Brown Bears football coaches
Charleston Southern Buccaneers athletic directors
Florida State Seminoles football coaches
Gettysburg Bullets football players
Lehigh Mountain Hawks football coaches
New England Patriots executives
Rutgers Scarlet Knights football coaches
Princeton Tigers football coaches
Wake Forest Demon Deacons football coaches
Rutgers University alumni
People from Livingston, New Jersey